Astra Sharma was the defending champion having won the previous edition in 2019, however she chose to participate at the 2022 BNP Paribas Open instead.

Zhu Lin won the title, defeating Rebecca Marino in the final, 6–4, 6–1.

Seeds

Draw

Finals

Top half

Bottom half

References

Main Draw

Guanajuato Open - Singles